Jean-Marie Morisset (born 18 August 1947 in Parthenay) is a former French politician. He represented the 3rd constituency of the Deux-Sèvres department in the National Assembly of France from 1993 to 2012,  as a member of the Union for a Popular Movement.

References

1947 births
Living people
People from Deux-Sèvres
Politicians from Nouvelle-Aquitaine
Union for French Democracy politicians
Union for a Popular Movement politicians
Deputies of the 10th National Assembly of the French Fifth Republic
Deputies of the 11th National Assembly of the French Fifth Republic
Deputies of the 12th National Assembly of the French Fifth Republic
Deputies of the 13th National Assembly of the French Fifth Republic
Senators of Deux-Sèvres

20th-century French politicians
21st-century French politicians